Norman Robert Hook (27 October 1928 – 3 October 2011), was an English international lawn bowler.

Bowls career
Hook was an England international from 1968 until 1970.

He represented England in the rinks (fours), at the 1970 British Commonwealth Games in Edinburgh, Scotland with Harry Powell, Bobby Stenhouse and Cliff Stroud.

References

English male bowls players
1928 births
2011 deaths
Bowls players at the 1970 British Commonwealth Games
Commonwealth Games competitors for England